Karl Robert Pracht (born April 12, 1878, Mulhouse; d. May 4, 1961, Karlsruhe) was a German composer and music educator. He is well known for his piano and string works as well as his numerous choral compositions.

Pracht was born in Mulhouse; his father was kapellmeister Robert Ottmar Pracht. After finishing basic education he studied at the Meersburg teaching school and then at the Mannheim Academy of Music from 1900 to 1904. In the meantime he finished his staatsexamen (master's degree) in 1902 in Karlsruhe.

After teaching a period in Meersburg, Pracht had been appointed music teacher at the Humboldt Gymnasium in Karlsruhe where he worked more than two decades until retiring in 1945. As a teacher he published many music education works for piano, strings and brass as well as musicological papers.

Additionally, Pracht was a renowned conductor of various men's choirs all over Baden and composed more than 200 traditional choir songs. In 1953 he was awarded the Federal Cross of Merit.

Pracht died in 1961 in Karlsruhe at the age of 83.

Selected compositions
 Choral songs
 Das Morgenrot
 Der Tag bricht an
 Deutscher Frühling
 Drei Nelken
 Drei Rosen
 Ewige Melodie
 Lenzlust
 Mein Hegau
 Moorgrab
 O deutscher Wald
 Roland
 Sonntag ist heut
 Wanderlust
 Weinland
 Wirtin, schenk ein
 Piano works
 Beceuse und Scherzo für Klavier
 Jugendalbum für Klavier
 Stimmungsbilder für Klavier
 Works for chamber music and orchestra

External links
 MIDI file of Weinland (for mixed choir)
 MIDI file of Das Morgenrot (for men's choir)

1878 births
1961 deaths
German composers
German music educators
Recipients of the Cross of the Order of Merit of the Federal Republic of Germany